Located in southwestern Washington and northwestern Oregon, United States, the Julia Butler Hansen Refuge for the Columbian White-Tailed Deer was established in 1972 specifically to protect and manage the endangered Columbian white-tailed deer.

The valuable habitat the refuge preserves for the deer also benefits a large variety of wintering birds, a small herd of Roosevelt elk, river otter, various reptiles and amphibians including painted turtles and red-legged frogs, and several pairs of nesting bald eagles and osprey. Today, about 300 Columbian white-tailed deer live on the refuge.

Another 300-400 live on private lands along the river. The areas upstream from the refuge on Puget Island and on the Oregon side of the river are vital to reestablishing and maintaining viable populations of the species. The refuge works with private and corporate landowners to maintain and reestablish deer on their lands.

The refuge is named for Julia Butler Hansen, a former member of the United States House of Representatives for Washington state.

In April, 2012, high river flow levels coupled with a collapsing dike, that keeps the Columbia River from flooding the Julia Butler Hansen Refuge, was reported to be a threat to the resident population of Columbian white-tailed deer.

References

Refuge website

National Wildlife Refuges in Washington (state)
National Wildlife Refuges in Oregon
Protected areas of Wahkiakum County, Washington
Protected areas of Columbia County, Oregon
Protected areas of Clatsop County, Oregon
Protected areas established in 1972
1972 establishments in Oregon
Wetlands of Oregon
Wetlands of Washington (state)
Landforms of Wahkiakum County, Washington
Landforms of Columbia County, Oregon
Landforms of Clatsop County, Oregon